Freel Peak is a mountain located in the Carson Range, a spur of the Sierra Nevada, near Lake Tahoe in California.

The peak is on the boundary between El Dorado County and Alpine County; and the boundary between the Eldorado National Forest and the Humboldt-Toiyabe National Forest.
At , it is the tallest summit in the Carson Range, El Dorado County, and the Tahoe Basin. Due to its elevation, most of the precipitation that falls on the mountain is snow.

In 1893, the U.S. Geological Survey assigned the name Freel Peak to what was then known as Jobs Peak. James Freel was an early settler in the area.

Climate
According to the Köppen climate classification system, Freel Peak is located in an alpine climate zone. Most weather fronts originate in the Pacific Ocean, and travel east toward the Sierra Nevada mountains. As fronts approach, they are forced upward by the peaks (orographic lift), causing them to drop their moisture in the form of rain or snowfall onto the range.

Gallery

References 

Mountains of the Sierra Nevada (United States)
Mountains of El Dorado County, California
Mountains of Alpine County, California
Eldorado National Forest
Humboldt–Toiyabe National Forest
Mountains of Northern California
North American 3000 m summits